Note:

Yangtze River Delta